Charles Melbourne "Jim" Forbes (26 December 1908 – 13 November 1981) was an Australian rules footballer who played with St Kilda in the Victorian Football League (VFL).

Notes

External links 

Jim C. Forbes's playing statistics from The VFA Project

1908 births
1981 deaths
Australian rules footballers from Melbourne
St Kilda Football Club players
South Yarra Football Club players
People from Prahran, Victoria